KKOJ (1190 AM) is a radio station broadcasting a classic country music format. It is licensed to Jackson, Minnesota, United States. The station is licensed to Community First Broadcasting, LLC.

On January 11, 2022 KKOJ shifted their format from country to classic country.

References

External links

Daytime-only radio stations in Minnesota
Classic country radio stations in the United States
Radio stations in Minnesota
Radio stations established in 1980
1980 establishments in Minnesota